This is a list of films produced by the Tollywood (Telugu language film industry) based in Hyderabad in the year 1999.

Releases

Dubbed films

References

1999
Telugu
 Telugu films
1999 in Indian cinema